Meir ben Isaac Katzenellenbogen (c. 1482 – 12 January 1565) (also, Meir of Padua, or Maharam Padua) was a German rabbi born in Katzenelnbogen.

Biography
Meïr ben Isaac, who was often called after his native town, was the founder of the Katzenellenbogen family. After studying at Prague under the well-known casuist Jacob Pollak, he went to Padua and entered the yeshiva of Judah Minz, whose granddaughter, Hannah, he afterwards married. He succeeded his father-in-law, Abraham Minz, in the chief rabbinate of Padua, which office he held until his death on 12 January 1565 (epitaph below). He was the father of Samuel Judah Katzenellenbogen.

Meïr was also nominal rabbi of Venice, where he went several times a year, but he had his fixed residence at Padua. Meïr was considered by his contemporaries a great authority on Talmudic and rabbinical matters, and many rabbis consulted him, among them: Moses Alashkar, Obadiah Sforno, and his relative Moses Isserles (who addressed him as "rabbi of Venice"). It may be seen from his responsa (ninety in number, published by himself, with those of Judah Minz, under the title of She'elot u-Teshubot, Venice, 1553), as well as from those of Isserles, that he was disposed to be liberal in his decisions. Another indication of his leaning toward liberalism was his use in his responsa (Nos. 38, 49, 72) of the civil names of the months, a thing not done by other rabbis of his time.

Joseph ben Mordechai Gershon says (She'erit Yosef, pp. 3b) that Meïr, in one of his responsa, told him not to rely at that time on his opinion, because he could not verify his decision by the Talmud, all the copies of which had been burned. This burning is mentioned by David Gans (Ẓemaḥ Dawid, p. 56, Warsaw, 1890) and by Heilprin (Seder haDorot, i.245, ed. Maskileison) as having occurred in 1553 or 1554 under Pope Julius III, at the instigation of certain baptized Jews. Meïr states also (Responsa, No. 78) that in Candia the hafṭarah for Yom Kippur Minḥah was, with the exception of the first three verses, read in Greek (comp. Zunz, G.V. p. 413, note). In Responsum No. 86 he speaks of the plague that raged at Venice, but without indicating the year. Many of his responsa are to be found in the collection of Isserles. Meïr added to the edition of his responsa his father-in-law's Seder Giṭṭin wa-Ḥaliẓah, and a detailed index. He edited also Maimonides' Yad, with some commentaries, to which he added notes of his own (Venice, 1550; see Isserles).

Cecil Roth, History of the Jews in Venice, page 256. In 1549 Katezenellenbogen became embroiled in a dispute over the publication of a printed edition of Maimonides' Mishneh Torah. Since Jews could not own printing presses at that time, presses were owned by Venetian noblemen and operated by Jews under the patronage of the non-Jewish owner. Rabbi Katzenellenbogen edited a printed edition of the Mishneh Torah to be published by the Bragadini press. That work was soon pirated by the rival Giustiniani press. Rabbi Katzenellenbogen appealed to his relative Moses Isserles, who replied that the Giustiniani edition violated the prohibition on Hasogas gevul, interfering with another person's livelihood. The Giustiniani parties denounced the rival publishers to the non-Jewish censors, leading to a massive burning of volumes of the Talmud and other Jewish works in the Venetian Republic.

Katzenellenbogen was the author of ninety responsa published under the title, She'eilot U'teshuvot. Katzenellenbogen's epitaph reads:

Three centuries after his death, the 10th day of the Jewish month of Shevat became widely recognized as a significant date by Hasidic Judaism. It is the anniversary of the passing of Rabbi Shalom Sharabi (1777), known as "the Rashash" and considered the father of all contemporary Sephardic kabbalists, the sixth Lubavitcher Rebbe, Yosef Yitzchak Schneersohn (1950) and the date upon which the seventh Rebbe, Menachem Mendel Schneerson, formally accepted the leadership of Chabad (1951).

His wife Hannah's epitaph reads:

Some notable descendants

Rabbi Katzenellenbogen had many notable descendants.

Herbert L. Anderson
Meir Bar-Ilan
Max Beloff, Baron Beloff
Martin Buber
Baron Henry DeWorms
Felix Gilbert
David Halberstam
Abraham Joshua Heschel
Eyran Katsenelenbogen
John Katzenellenbogen
Julius Klein
Jean Longuet
Karl Marx
Benjamin Mazar
Felix Mendelssohn
Baron Guy de Rothschild
Helena Rubinstein
Howard F. Sachs
Max Schur
Ephraim Avigdor Speiser
DeWitt Stetten Jr.
Otto Warburg
Baron George Weidenfeld
Basil Wigoder
Andrew Denton
Chanoch Dov Padwa
Catherine Yronwode
Franz Reizenstein
Chaim Halberstam

Bibliography
Azulai, Shem ha-Gedolim, i
Eisenstadt-Wiener, Da'at Ḳedoshim, p. 82
Fränkel, in Orient. Lit. vii.609–613
Fürst, Bibl. Jud. ii.179
Ghirondi, in Kerem. Ḥemed, iii.93 et seq.
Rosenstein, Neil. The Unbroken Chain, C.I.S. Publishers, The Computer Center for Jewish Genealogy, Elizabeth, New Jersey, 1990. . (Rosenstein is a descendent, too)
Steinschneider, Cat. Bodl. col. 1702
M. Straschun, in Fuenn's Ḳiryah Ne'emanah, pp. 321 et seq.
Zipser, in Orient. Lit. ix.367

References

External links

1482 births
1565 deaths
16th-century Italian rabbis
German Ashkenazi Jews
Italian Ashkenazi Jews
Italian people of German descent